A hydraulic jump is a phenomenon in the science of hydraulics which is frequently observed in open channel flow such as rivers and spillways. When liquid at high velocity discharges into a zone of lower velocity, a rather abrupt rise occurs in the liquid surface. The rapidly flowing liquid is abruptly slowed and increases in height, converting some of the flow's initial kinetic energy into an increase in potential energy, with some energy irreversibly lost through turbulence to heat. In an open channel flow, this manifests as the fast flow rapidly slowing and piling up on top of itself similar to how a shockwave forms.

It was first observed and documented by Leonardo da Vinci in the 1500s. The mathematics were first described by Giorgio Bidone of Turin University when he published a paper in 1820 called Experiences sur le remou et sur la propagation des ondes.

The phenomenon is dependent upon the initial fluid speed. If the initial speed of the fluid is below the critical speed, then no jump is possible. For initial flow speeds which are not significantly above the critical speed, the transition appears as an undulating wave. As the initial flow speed increases further, the transition becomes more abrupt, until at high enough speeds, the transition front will break and curl back upon itself. When this happens, the jump can be accompanied by violent turbulence, eddying, air entrainment, and surface undulations, or waves.

There are two main manifestations of hydraulic jumps and historically different terminology has been used for each. However, the mechanisms behind them are similar because they are simply variations of each other seen from different frames of reference, and so the physics and analysis techniques can be used for both types.

The different manifestations are:

 The stationary hydraulic jump – rapidly flowing water transitions in a stationary jump to slowly moving water as shown in Figures 1 and 2.
 The tidal bore – a wall or undulating wave of water moves upstream against water flowing downstream as shown in Figures 3 and 4. If one considers a frame of reference which moves along with the wave front, then the wave front is stationary relative to the frame and has the same essential behavior as the stationary jump.
A related case is a cascade – a wall or undulating wave of water moves downstream overtaking a shallower downstream flow of water as shown in Figure 5. If considered from a frame of reference which moves with the wave front, this is amenable to the same analysis as a stationary jump.

These phenomena are addressed in an extensive literature from a number of technical viewpoints.

Hydraulic Jump is used sometimes in mixing chemicals.

Classes of hydraulic jumps

Hydraulic jumps can be seen in both a stationary form, which is known as a "hydraulic jump", and a dynamic or moving form, which is known as a positive surge or "hydraulic jump in translation". They can be described using the same analytic approaches and are simply variants of a single phenomenon.

Moving hydraulic jump

A tidal bore is a hydraulic jump which occurs when the incoming tide forms a wave (or waves) of water that travel up a river or narrow bay against the direction of the current. As is true for hydraulic jumps in general, bores take on various forms depending upon the difference in the waterlevel upstream and down, ranging from an undular wavefront to a shock-wave-like wall of water. Figure 3 shows a tidal bore with the characteristics common to shallow upstream water – a large elevation difference is observed. Figure 4 shows a tidal bore with the characteristics common to deep upstream water – a small elevation difference is observed and the wavefront undulates. In both cases the tidal wave moves at the speed characteristic of waves in water of the depth found immediately behind the wave front. A key feature of tidal bores and positive surges is the intense turbulent mixing induced by the passage of the bore front and by the following wave motion.

Another variation of the moving hydraulic jump is the cascade. In the cascade, a series of roll waves or undulating waves of water moves downstream overtaking a shallower downstream flow of water.

A moving hydraulic jump is called a surge. The travel of wave is faster in the upper portion than in the lower portion in case of positive surges

Stationary hydraulic jump
A stationary hydraulic jump is the 
type  most frequently seen on rivers and on engineered features such as outfalls of dams and irrigation works. They occur when a flow of liquid at high velocity discharges into a zone of the river or engineered structure which can only sustain a lower velocity. When this occurs, the water slows in a rather abrupt rise (a step or standing wave) on the liquid surface.

Comparing the characteristics before and after, one finds:

The other stationary hydraulic jump occurs when a rapid flow encounters a submerged object which throws the water upward. The mathematics behind this form is more complex and will need to take into account the shape of the object and the flow characteristics of the fluid around it.

Analysis of the hydraulic jump on a liquid surface

In spite of the apparent complexity of the flow transition, application of simple analytic tools to a two dimensional analysis is effective in providing analytic results which closely parallel both field and laboratory results. Analysis shows:
 Height of the jump: the relationship between the depths before and after the jump as a function of flow rate
 Energy loss in the jump
 Location of the jump on a natural or an engineered structure
 Character of the jump: undular or abrupt

Height of the jump
The height of the jump is derived from the application of the equations of conservation of mass and momentum. There are several methods of predicting the height of a hydraulic jump.

They all reach common conclusions that:
 The ratio of the water depth before and after the jump depend solely on the ratio of velocity of the water entering the jump to the speed of the wave over-running the moving water.
 The height of the jump can be many times the initial depth of the water.

For a known flow rate  as shown by the figure below, the approximation that the momentum flux is the same just up- and downstream of the energy principle yields an expression of the energy loss in the hydraulic jump. Hydraulic jumps are commonly used as energy dissipators downstream of dam spillways.

 Applying the continuity principle
In fluid dynamics, the equation of continuity is effectively an equation of conservation of mass. Considering any fixed closed surface within an incompressible moving fluid, the fluid flows into a given volume at some points and flows out at other points along the surface with no net change in mass within the space since the density is constant. In case of a rectangular channel, then the equality of mass flux upstream and downstream gives:

  or  

 Conservation of momentum flux
For a straight prismatic rectangular channel, the conservation of momentum flux across the jump, assuming constant density, can be expressed as:

In rectangular channel, such conservation equation can be further simplified to dimensionless M-y equation form, which is widely used in hydraulic jump analysis in open channel flow.

Jump height in terms of flow
Dividing by constant  and introducing the result from continuity gives

which, after some algebra, simplifies to:

where  Here  is the dimensionless Froude number, and relates inertial to gravitational forces in the upstream flow. Solving this quadratic yields:

Negative answers do not yield meaningful physical solutions, so this reduces to:

  so

known as Bélanger equation. The result may be extended to an irregular cross-section.

This produces three solution classes:
 When , then  (i.e., there is no jump)
 When , then  (i.e., there is a negative jump – this can be shown as not conserving energy and is only physically possible if some force were to accelerate the fluid at that point)
 When , then  (i.e., there is a positive jump)

This is equivalent to the condition that .

Undulations downstream of the jump 
Practically this means that water accelerated by large drops can create stronger standing waves (undular bores) in the form of hydraulic jumps as it decelerates at the base of the drop. Such standing waves, when found downstream of a weir or natural rock ledge, can form an extremely dangerous "keeper" with a water wall that "keeps" floating objects (e.g., logs, kayaks, or kayakers) recirculating in the standing wave for extended periods.

Energy dissipation by a hydraulic jump

One of the most important engineering applications of the hydraulic jump is to dissipate energy in channels, dam spillways, and similar structures so that the excess kinetic energy does not damage these structures. The rate of energy dissipation or head loss across a hydraulic jump is a function of the hydraulic jump inflow Froude number and the height of the jump.

The energy loss at a hydraulic jump expressed as a head loss is:

Location of hydraulic jump in a streambed or an engineered structure
In the design of a dam the energy of the fast-flowing stream over a spillway must be partially dissipated to prevent erosion of the streambed downstream of the spillway, which could ultimately lead to failure of the dam. This can be done by arranging for the formation of a hydraulic jump to dissipate energy. To limit damage, this hydraulic jump normally occurs on an apron engineered to withstand hydraulic forces and to prevent local cavitation and other phenomena which accelerate erosion.

In the design of a spillway and apron, the engineers select the point at which a hydraulic jump will occur. Obstructions or slope changes are routinely designed into the apron to force a jump at a specific location. Obstructions are unnecessary, as the slope change alone is normally sufficient. To trigger the hydraulic jump without obstacles, an apron is designed such that the flat slope of the apron retards the rapidly flowing water from the spillway. If the apron slope is insufficient to maintain the original high velocity, a jump will occur.

Two methods of designing an induced jump are common:

 If the downstream flow is restricted by the down-stream channel such that water backs up onto the foot of the spillway, that downstream water level can be used to identify the location of the jump.
 If the spillway continues to drop for some distance, but the slope changes such that it will no longer support supercritical flow, the depth in the lower subcritical flow region is sufficient to determine the location of the jump.

In both cases, the final depth of the water is determined by the downstream characteristics. The jump will occur if and only if the level of inflowing (supercritical) water level satisfies the condition:

 

  = Upstream Froude Number
 g = acceleration due to gravity (essentially constant for this case)
 h = height of the fluid ( = initial height while  = upstream height)

Air entrainment in hydraulic jumps
The hydraulic jump is characterised by a highly turbulent flow. Macro-scale vortices develop in the jump roller and interact
with the free surface leading to air bubble entrainment, splashes and droplets formation in the two-phase flow region. The air–water flow is associated with turbulence, which can also lead to sediment transport. The turbulence may be strongly affected by the bubble dynamics. Physically, the mechanisms involved in these processes are complex.

The air entrainment occurs in the form of air bubbles and air packets entrapped at the impingement of the upstream jet flow with the roller. The air packets are broken up in very small air bubbles as they are entrained in the shear region, characterised by large air contents and maximum bubble count rates. Once the entrained bubbles are advected into regions of lesser shear, bubble collisions and coalescence lead to larger air entities that are driven toward the free-surface by a combination of buoyancy and turbulent advection.

Tabular summary of the analytic conclusions

NB: the above classification is very rough. Undular hydraulic jumps have been observed with inflow/prejump Froude numbers up to 3.5 to 4.

Hydraulic jump variations
A number of variations are amenable to similar analysis:

Shallow fluid hydraulic jumps
The hydraulic jump in a sink
Figure 2 above illustrates an example of a hydraulic jump, often seen in a kitchen sink. Around the place where the tap water hits the sink, a smooth-looking flow pattern will occur. A little further away, a sudden "jump" in the water level will be present. This is a hydraulic jump.

On impingement of a liquid jet normally on to a surface, the liquid spreads radially in a thin film until a point where the film thickness changes abruptly. This abrupt change in liquid film thickness is called a circular hydraulic jump. Most articles in literature assume that the thin film hydraulic jumps are created due to gravity (related to the Froude number). However, a recent scientific study questioned this more than century-old belief. The authors experimentally and theoretically investigated the possibility for kitchen sink hydraulic jumps to be created due to surface tension instead of gravity. To rule out the role of gravity in the formation of a circular hydraulic jump, authors performed experiments on horizontal, vertical and on an inclined surface and showed that irrespective of the orientation of the substrate, for same flow rate and physical properties of the liquid, the initial hydraulic jump happens at the same location. They proposed a model for the phenomenon and
found the general criterion for a thin film hydraulic jump to be 

In other words, a thin film hydraulic jump occurs when the liquid momentum per unit width equals the surface tension of the liquid. However, this model stays heavily contested.

Internal wave hydraulic jumps

Hydraulic jumps in abyssal fan formation 

Turbidity currents can result in internal hydraulic jumps (i.e., hydraulic jumps as internal waves in fluids of different density) in abyssal fan formation. The internal hydraulic jumps have been associated with salinity or temperature induced stratification as well as with density differences due to suspended materials. When the slope of the bed (over which the turbidity current flows) flattens, the slower rate of flow is mirrored by increased sediment deposition below the flow, producing a gradual backward slope. Where a hydraulic jump occurs, the signature is an abrupt backward slope, corresponding to the rapid reduction in the flow rate at the point of the jump.

Atmospheric hydraulic jumps
Hydraulic jumps occur in the atmosphere in the air flowing over mountains.  A hydraulic jump also occurs at the tropopause interface between the stratosphere and troposphere downwind of the overshooting top of very strong supercell thunderstorms. A related situation is the Morning Glory cloud observed, for example, in Northern Australia, sometimes called an undular jump.

Industrial and recreational applications for hydraulic jumps

Industrial
The hydraulic jump is the most commonly used choice of design engineers for energy dissipation below spillways and outlets. A properly designed hydraulic jump can provide for 60-70% energy dissipation of the energy in the basin itself, limiting the damage to structures and the streambed. Even with such efficient energy dissipation, stilling basins must be carefully designed to avoid serious damage due to uplift, vibration, cavitation, and abrasion. An extensive literature has been developed for this type of engineering.

Recreational
While travelling down river, kayaking and canoeing paddlers will often stop and playboat in standing waves and hydraulic jumps. The standing waves and shock fronts of hydraulic jumps make for popular locations for such recreation.

Similarly, kayakers and surfers have been known to ride tidal bores up rivers.

Hydraulic jumps have been used by glider pilots in the Andes and Alps and to ride Morning Glory effects in Australia.

See also

References and notes

Further reading

Fluid dynamics
Hydraulics concepts
Wave mechanics